The Man Who Lost Himself is a 1918 comedy drama novel by the Irish-born writer Henry De Vere Stacpoole. The plot revolves around an American from Philadelphia, Victor Jones, arriving in London to find himself the exact Doppelgänger of a British aristocrat.

Film adaptations
In 1920 it was made into an American silent film The Man Who Lost Himself directed by Clarence G. Badger and featuring William Faversham and Hedda Hopper. It was later remade as a 1941 film of the same title directed by Edward Ludwig and starring Brian Aherne and Kay Francis.

References

Sources
 Goble, Alan. The Complete Index to Literary Sources in Film. Walter de Gruyter, 1999.
 Loeber, Rolf, Stouthamer-Loeber, Magda & Burnham, Anne Mullin. A Guide to Irish Fiction, 1650-1900. Four Courts, 2006.

1918 British novels
Irish novels
British comedy novels
Novels by Henry De Vere Stacpoole
British novels adapted into films
Irish novels adapted into films
Novels set in London
Hutchinson (publisher) books